Navacerrada is a municipality of the Community of Madrid, Spain.

Located  from Madrid, it has only 2,500 permanent residences, but winter visitors increase the population. The Port of Navacerrada has a popular ski resort that is very popular with winter sportspeople. It has a ski school and various restaurants, hotels and accommodation.

Climate 
Although relatively close to Madrid, Navacerrada has a Mediterranean climate with cool/warm summers due to elevation (Köppen: Csb) or dry-summer continental climate (Dsb) by 0 °C isoterm, winter is also usually on average a few degrees cooler than the Spanish capital. The city has a clearly dry summer, but the high rainfall can be between spring and fall, being lower only in late winter, rather than gradually decreasing in transitional seasons.
The next graphic shows the averages and record temperatures at the Navacerrada mountain pass, which is located at an elevation 600 meters above the village of Navacerrada.

Public transport

Bus 

 690: Guadarrama - Collado Mediano - Navacerrada

 691: Madrid (Moncloa) - Becerril de la Sierra - Navacerrada - Valdesquí

 696: Collado Villalba (hospital) - Navacerrada

Train 

Navacerrada has a train station by which line C-9 of Cercanías Madrid runs through. This line connects Navacerrada with Cotos and Cercedilla.

References

External links

Municipalities in the Community of Madrid